Sahara Sue is the informal nickname given to a murder victim who was found in Las Vegas, Nevada, on August 14, 1979. Her identity is unknown. She was nicknamed "Sahara Sue" because her body was found near the Sahara Hotel in Las Vegas, at the intersection of Sahara and Las Vegas Boulevard. Recent developments indicate she may have used the name "Shawna" or "Shauna" when she was alive.

The victim is also known by the fact that she was wearing a complete upper denture despite her young age, but the lower denture was missing. She was photographed, reconstructed, fingerprinted, and had her DNA analyzed, yet she has remained unidentified for over 40 years.

Discovery
Sahara Sue's body was found lying face down in a parking lot on August 14, 1979. It was estimated that she had died three to four hours before being found. She had been stabbed several times in the abdomen.

It has been reported that a woman matching her description was seen with a white man before discovery of the body.

Description
Sahara Sue was a white woman with brown eyes and wavy light brown hair. She was 5 feet 6 inches tall and weighed 100 – 105 pounds. Her age has been estimated to be between 15 and 30. She had no teeth and did wear at least one denture, as the maxillary piece was discovered in her mouth after the body was located. The mandibular piece was not recovered. The nails on her feet and hands had been manicured and painted with red polish.

She was wearing a shirt and hip-hugger jeans. Her shirt was blue and made of linen, with a tie near the waist area. It had red embroidered designs and sequins. Her shoes were not found and it was evident that the killer had removed some of her clothing.

Jewelry
On her right hand, she had a ring made of white metal without any stone. She was wearing two pendant necklaces made of white metal. One pendant had a leaf design and a round turquoise stone. The other was made of plastic and was heart-shaped with a rose design. She was not wearing earrings, and her ears had not been pierced.

Investigation
Fingerprints were taken from the body and entered into national databases, but no match was found. Her body was exhumed in 2003 to obtain DNA but no match was found. In 2011, her DNA was tested to see if she was a match to Deborah Rae Meyer, who had vanished in August 1974. They both had dentures and shared similarities, but DNA testing proved they were not the same person and Meyer remains missing. Through these forms of body identification, at least seven missing people have been ruled out as possible identities for Sahara Sue. Pictures of her face have also been released to public websites, and multiple reconstructions of her face also exist.

In 2016, investigation yielded several major developments in the victim's case. Forensic palynology on her clothing indicated she had spent time in Napa Valley or Central Valley of California sometime before her murder. Another potential lead was followed that suggested that Sahara Sue may have ties to a trailer park in the area. Further investigation indicated she might have used the name "Shawna" or "Shauna" and may have been employed at a Holiday Inn or another motel on Las Vegas Boulevard.

See also
 Cold case
 List of murdered American children
 List of unsolved murders
 The Doe Network
 Unidentified decedent

References

External links

 

1954 births
1979 deaths
1979 in Nevada
1979 murders in the United States
Deaths by stabbing in the United States
Forensic palynology
Murdered American children
People from Las Vegas
People murdered in Nevada
Unidentified murder victims in Nevada
Unsolved murders in the United States
Year of birth unknown
Female murder victims
Women in Nevada